Wind power in California had initiative and early development during Governor Jerry Brown's first two terms in the late 1970s and early 1980s. The state's wind power capacity has grown by nearly 350% since 2001, when it was less than 1,700 MW. In 2016, wind energy (including that supplied by other states) supplied about 6.9% of California's total electricity needs, or enough to power more than 1.3 million households.  Most of California's wind generation is found in the Tehachapi area of Kern County, California, with some large projects in Solano, Contra Costa and Riverside counties as well. California is among the states with the largest amount of installed wind power capacity. In recent years, California has lagged behind other states when it comes to the installation of wind power. It was ranked 4th overall for wind power electrical generation at the end of 2016 behind Texas, Iowa, and Oklahoma. As of 2019, California had 5,973 megawatts (MW) of wind power generating capacity installed.

History 

California was the first U.S. state where large wind farms were developed, beginning in the early 1980s. By 1995, California produced 30 percent of the entire world's wind-generated electricity. Wind power in Texas surpassed the production in California to become the leader in the United States.

Historically, most of California's wind power output has been in three primary regions: Altamont Pass wind farm (east of San Francisco); Tehachapi Pass wind farm (south east of Bakersfield) and San Gorgonio Pass wind farm (near Palm Springs, east of Los Angeles). A fourth area, the Montezuma Hills of Solano County, was developed in 2005–2009, with the large Shiloh wind power plant.

The Alta Wind Energy Center is a wind farm located in Tehachapi Pass in Kern County. Kern County is reviewing a number of other proposed wind projects that would generate a combined 4,600 megawatts of renewable energy if approved.

Growth 

In 2011, 921.3 megawatts of new production was installed. Most of that activity occurred in the Tehachapi area of Kern County, with some big projects in Solano, Contra Costa and Riverside counties as well.

California had a total of 5,662 megawatts of installed wind generation capacity at the end of 2015. After leading the country for many years, California  ranked fourth nationwide in terms of capacity, behind Texas, Iowa, and Oklahoma in 2016. 
In 2016, California used about 285,700 GWh and generated 13,500 GWh of wind energy in state.

Wind energy supplied about 6.9% of California's total electricity needs in 2017 (including power supplied from other states in this case), and 7.35% in 2019. By the end of 2019, installed wind generation capacity increased to 5,973 megawatts.

Due to higher average winds in the plains area of the U.S., California ranked fifth in wind generation in 2018.

In January 2018, the Tule Wind Project came online. Located in eastern San Diego County, the facility has 57 wind turbines which collectively generate 131.1 megawatts of electricity. There are plans to expand this project by an additional 24 turbines in the future. In its current configuration, the installation is able to power an estimated 40,000 homes. CAISO tested the wind farm's synchronverter in 2018, and found it could perform some of the grid services similar or better than traditional generators.

In February 2018, Scout Clean Energy of Colorado won the rights to modernize the Gonzaga Ridge wind farm which is located in Pacheco State Park. Rated at 16.5 megawatts, the Gonzaga Ridge facility currently uses 1980s era wind turbines which are smaller, less cost-effective, and overall far less efficient at generating energy than those which currently being produced. The electrical output of Gonzaga Ridge  after modernization is projected to be between 65 MW and 80 MW.

Offshore wind 
A 2009 Stanford University study of California offshore wind potential identified a site off Cape Mendocino that could provide uninterrupted year-round power from a 1500 MW wind farm that would produce an average of 790 MW.

In April 2018, several power development companies joined with Redwood Coast Energy Authority to explore the idea of creating a large-scale wind farm off of the Northern California coast. Deep water has hindered development off the coast of California, making the use floating turbines more feasible than fixed turbines. The group decided to propose instead. RCEA and the development companies intended to file a lease with the Bureau of Ocean Energy Management in the summer of 2018 for the 120-150 MW project. In 2022, the US Bureau of Ocean Energy Management (BOEM) issued a statement of no significant environmental impact, and California set a target of 25 GW of offshore wind by 2045.

Annual generation

Source:

See also

Solar power in California
Renewable energy in California
Wind power in the United States
Renewable energy in the United States
List of wind farms in the United States
Clipper Windpower

References

External links

Daily California renewable energy generation report